Call login systems are telephone systems that allow voice-based call center executives to log into their phone equipment in order to make or receive calls. This system helps in calculating login hours, documentation hours, and break timings.  Examples include AVAYA and Nortel.

References 

Telephony